This is a list of diplomatic missions in Tunisia. There are currently 64 embassies in Tunis, and many countries maintain consulates in other Tunisian cities (not including honorary consulates).

Embassies in Tunis

Other diplomatic offices in Tunis 
 (Delegation)

Gallery

Consulates

Consulate in El Kef 
 (Consulate-General)

Consulate in Gafsa 
 (Consulate-General)

Consulate in Sfax 
 (Consulate-General)

Consulate in Tunis

Non-resident embassies 

Resident in Algiers, Algeria

 
 
 
 
 
 
 
 
 
 
 
 
 

 

Resident in Tripoli, Libya

Resident in Rabat, Morocco

 

 
 

 

Resident in Paris, France

 
 

 
 
 

 
 
 

Resident in Cairo, Egypt

 
 
 
 

 
 
 
 

 

 

Resident elsewhere

 (Valletta)
 (Rome/Paris/Cairo)
(Rome)
 (Paris/Rabat)
 (Ankara)
 (Riga)
 (Geneva)
 (Singapore)
 (Rome)
 (Ankara)

See also 
 Foreign relations of Tunisia

References

External links 
 Tunisian Ministry of Foreign Affairs

Foreign relations of Tunisia
Tunisia
Diplomatic missions